Esko Olavi Mikkola (born 14 February 1975 in Tampere) is a Finnish javelin thrower.

He won a silver medal at the 2003 Summer Universiade in Daegu and finished eleventh at the 2004 Olympic Games in Athens. He then competed at the 2005 World Championships without reaching the final.

His personal best throw is 84.27 metres, achieved in July 2004 in Nokia.

Javelin throwing is not Mikkola's only claim to fame.  His first sport was wrestling, which he did for ten years or more and is now exploring the sport of bobsledding.

Esko was a research assistant at The University of Arizona, Electrical and Computer Engineering Department and has published numerous papers in the fields of prognostic cells and radiation effects. As of spring 2008, Mikkola has completed his Ph.D. and has returned to Finland for the summer to concentrate on training for the 2008 Olympics.

Currently works as the CEO for the company Alphacore, located in Phoenix, Arizona.

Achievements

Seasonal bests by year
1992 - 61.36
1993 - 65.72
1994 - 73.32
1996 - 73.32
1997 - 73.34
1998 - 81.86
1999 - 81.61
2000 - 74.06
2001 - 82.48
2002 - 76.60
2003 - 82.02
2004 - 84.27
2005 - 82.14
2006 - 80.05
2007 - 82.34
2008 - 82.83
2009 - 80.08
2010 - 74.80

References
 

1975 births
Living people
Sportspeople from Tampere
University of Arizona alumni
Finnish male javelin throwers
Athletes (track and field) at the 2004 Summer Olympics
Olympic athletes of Finland
Universiade medalists in athletics (track and field)
Universiade silver medalists for Finland
Medalists at the 2003 Summer Universiade
Finnish expatriates in the United States
20th-century Finnish people
21st-century Finnish people